The government of Myanmar (earlier known as Burma) has two ministries controlling transportation, the Ministry of Transport and the Ministry of Rail Transport.

Road

total: 
paved: 
unpaved:  (2006)

The main highways are as follows:
 1 – Runs from Yangon to Mandalay, passing through Bago, Taungoo, Pyinmana and Meiktila.
 2 – Runs from Yangon to Mandalay, passing through Pyay, Magwe, Kyaukpadaung and Myingyan.
 3 – Runs from Mandalay to Muse, on the border with China, passing through Lashio.
 4 – Runs from Meiktila to Tachileik, on the border with Thailand, passing through Taunggyi and Kengtung.
 5 – Runs from Taungoo to Hopong, passing through Loikaw.
 6 – Runs from Yangon to Pathein.
 7 – Runs from Mandalay to Moreh, on the border with India, passing through Shwebo and Kale.
 8 – Runs from Hpagyargyi to Myeik, passing through Moulmein, Ye and Dawei.
12– Runs from Tada-U to Myingyan, passing through Gwekon, and Myotha.
 31 – Runs from Mandalay to Myitkyina, passing through Mogok and Bhamo.

There is one expressway in the country, which features double carriageway and four lanes on its entire length:
 Yangon-Mandalay Expressway – Runs from Yangon to Mandalay, by-passing Bago, Taungoo, Naypyidaw and Meiktila. Length:365 miles (587 km).

The other highways are as follows:
 Wonnral Road – Runs from Naungte to Retphaw, by- passing Hlagazaing, Myohaung, Duk Daw Nain, Kale, Kayin State, Tagondaing, Tamoowoug, Taungdi, Kyongawon, Phabya, Paya and Ta Nyin. Length: 35 miles (55 km).
In 2017, Yangon launched a bus network system that would reduce traffic and commute time of some two million commuters in the city.

Rail

, Myanmar had  of railways, all  gauge. There are currently no rail links to adjacent countries.

Water

;  navigable by large commercial vessels. (2008)

Belmond Ltd operates its business in Ayeyarwady River by the name Road to Mandalay River Cruise. Irrawaddy Flotilla Company was also in service along the Ayeyarwady River in the 20th century, until 1942, when the fleet was destroyed to prevent invading Japanese forces from making use of it. The IFC has since been revived as Pandaw, named for a salvaged original IFC ship, and is now one of the leading river cruise companies in the country.

Merchant marine

total:
Ships by type:
bulk carrier 1, cargo ship 17, passenger ship 2, passenger/cargo 3, specialised tanker 1 (2008)
note:
a flag of convenience registry; includes ships of 3 countries: Cyprus 1, Germany 1, Japan 1

Ports and harbours

Sea
 Yangon
 Sittwe (Akyab)
 Dawei – railhead – new deepwater port under construction 2005

River
 Myitkyina
 Bhamo
 Mandalay
 Pakokku
 Pathein

Air

Airports
In July 2010, the country had 69 airports. Only 11 of them had runways over 2 miles (3250 meters). Of the 11, only Yangon International , Mandalay International and Naypyidaw International had adequate facilities to handle larger jets.
total: 69
over 3,047 metres (3333 yards): 11
1524 to 3,047 metres (1666 yards to 3333 yards): 27
Under 1524 metres (1666 yards): 31

Heliports
4

Pipelines
 Crude oil ; natural gas .
 Proposed pipe from Kyaukphyu through Mandalay to Kunming

See also
 Road Transport Authority (Myanmar)
 Myanmar Railways

External links

References